Mamadou Djigué was a candidate for the 2013 Malian presidential election under the banner of the Youth Movement for Change and Development (MJCD). He announced his candidacy at a meeting held at the International Conference Centre of Bamako, the capital of Mali, in the presence of his father Ibrahima N'Diaye, senior vice president of the Alliance for Democracy in Mali-African Party for Solidarity and Justice.

References

Living people
Malian politicians
Year of birth missing (living people)
21st-century Malian people